Lloyd H. Paterson (July 20, 1925 – December 1988) was an American businessman and Republican politician from New York.

Biography
Paterson was born on July 20, 1925, in Niagara Falls, New York. He attended Niagara University on a basketball scholarship, played several seasons with the Niagara Purple Eagles, and graduated in 1951. He attended Rochester Institute of Technology in 1956. He engaged in the insurance business. In 1957, he was hired to coach the NU freshmen basketball team.

He entered politics as a Republican, and was a member of the Board of Supervisors of Niagara County (Niagara Falls, 15th Ward) in 1958 and 1959. He was appointed as a Deputy Commissioner of the New York State Athletic Commission on May 21, 1959. He became Treasurer of Niagara County from 1965 to 1972.

He was a member of the New York State Senate from 1973 to 1978, sitting in the 180th, 181st and 182nd New York State Legislatures. He was indicted for grand larceny, having embezzled more than $68,000 from private estates for which he acted as public administrator while being Niagara County Treasurer. On August 7, 1978, he was fined $18,500 and placed on probation for five years.

He died in December 1988.

In 1989, he was inducted into the Niagara University Athletics Hall of Fame.

References

1925 births
1988 deaths
Politicians from Niagara Falls, New York
Republican Party New York (state) state senators
Rochester Institute of Technology alumni
County legislators in New York (state)
Niagara Purple Eagles men's basketball players
American athlete-politicians
New York (state) politicians convicted of crimes
20th-century American politicians
American men's basketball players